Žnidarić is a surname. Notable people with the surname include:

Ivana Žnidarić (born 1985), Croatian model
Mia Žnidarič (born 1962), Slovenian singer

See also
Žnidaršič

South Slavic-language surnames